Circle Regenerated is the sixth and final full-length studio album by Finnish melodic death metal band Norther. The album was released through Century Media Records on 30 March in Japan, on 13 April in Finland, on 15 April in Germany, Austria, Switzerland and Norway, and on 18 April in the rest of Europe. The United States release followed on 19 April, and Australia and New Zealand on 22 April. The track "Break Myself Away" was previously released through their website as a free digital download. The album charted at number five on the Official Finnish Chart.

This is the band's only album to feature Aleksi Sihvonen and Daniel Freyberg as full-members of the band.

Track listing

Credits

Band members 
 Aleksi Sihvonen − lead vocals
 Kristian Ranta − guitar, clean vocals
 Daniel Freyberg − guitar, backing vocals
 Heikki Saari − drums
 Jukka Koskinen − bass, backing vocals
 Tuomas Planman − keyboards, programming

Production 
 Recorded and produced by Anssi Kippo at Astia Studios.

Release history

References 

2011 albums
Norther albums
Century Media Records albums